Titabor or Titabar is a town in the Jorhat district of Assam in India. It is about 20 km away from Jorhat City. It is one of the highly greeny places of Assam almost surrounded by different tea-estates. The town serves as the administrative headquarters of the Thengal Kachari Autonomous Council.

Geography

Demographics
In the 2001 Indian census, the Titabor subdivision had a population of 110,224. Males constitute 55% of the population and females 45%. Titabor has an average literacy rate of 81%, higher than the national average of 59.5%: male literacy is 84%, and female literacy is 77%; 11% of the population is under 6 years of age.

Transport
Titabor is well connected by road and railways. Na Ali and Gar Ali connect the town with Jorhat. Buses and mini vans are daily ply from Jorhat to Titabor. For long distance, ASTC and other private bus transportation service operate direct bus from Titabor to Guwahati via Jorhat. It has a railway station on Lumding-Dibrugarh section under the Tinsukia railway division of Northeast Frontier Railway. The nearest airport is Jorhat Airport.

Place of interests
Thengal Bhawan

The Thengal Bhawan is Located at Jalukonibari in Titabor, was built in 1880 by Raibahadur Siva Prasad Barooah. In 1929, he published a weekly Assamese newspaper. Later, he established his printing press and office at Thengal Bhawan and managed to publish a daily newspaper, Dainik Batori. It was the first Assamese daily newspaper. The Thengal Bhawan is now used as a guest house.

Thengal Cultural Centre and Museum

The Thengal Cultural Centre and Museum is located at Balijan Gaon. The museum is preserving the age old traditions, culture and heritage of the Thengal-Kachari community. It also has the amusement facilities for children.

Tea Gardens

Titabar Areas there Are Many Tea Garden in Redias of Apprx 20-25 Km. In the west There Are One of the Oldest Tea Garden Narayanpur Panbari Tea Estate, Saraipani Tea Estate ,Bukaholla Tea Estate,Duflating Tea Estate,Kachajan Tea Estate,Letekujan Tea Estate Etc..

Politics
The Titabar subdivision is part of the Jorhat (Lok Sabha constituency). The previous MLA from Titabar (Vidhan Sabha constituency) was Tarun Gogoi, the former Chief Minister of Assam - he has been in this seat since 2001 till he died on 23rd November 2020.Bhaskar Jyoti Baruah of INC is the incumbent MLA of this constituency. He is a Graduate from the St.Edmunds College, Shillong.

Education 
Pragjyotika Academy, situated in the heart of Titabor, is a secondary school. Concept Junior College is another private educational institute of the town. Titabar has also some famous educational institutions like Nanda Nath Saikia College, Mihiram Saikia Higher Secondary School and Jawahar Navodaya Vidyalaya, Jorhat. It also has the Regional Agricultural Research Station, Sericulture Training Institute and District Institute of Education and Training, Jorhat.

Notable People 
 Late Ashok Saikia, 1971 batch IAS officer of Assam-Meghalaya Cadre, Joint Secretary (PMO) in the Atal Bihari Vajpayee Government
Siva Prasad Barooah, tea planter, philanthropist, politician
 Bijoy Krishna Handique, former MP
 Hemendra Prasad Barooah, entrepreneur, tea planter and philanthropist
 Satyendra Nath Borkataki, ICS and former diplomat, historian 
 Shrinjan Rajkumar Gohain, Indian Chess Player
 Tarun Gogoi, former Chief Minister of Assam
 Jageswar Sarmah, litterateur and scholar
 Hirendra Nath Dutta, Sahitya Akademi Award winner poet

References

Cities and towns in Jorhat district
Jorhat